Cherry AG (formerly Cherry Corporation and stylized as CHERRY) is a German computer peripheral-device maker. The company has its roots in the United States and is headquartered in Germany. It has additional offices in the United States, France, and China. They manufactured a large range of products including sensors, vibrators and automotive modules until 2008, when Peter Cherry, the son of Walter L. Cherry, sold his company to ZF Friedrichshafen AG, a German supplier to the automotive industry. Cherry was renamed ZF Electronics GmbH, while the Cherry brand was continued only for its computer input devices. Since the beginning of 2016 this product line has been operating independently on the market as the Cherry Group. After an eight-year partnership with ZF Friedrichshafen AG, Cherry (the computer input device manufacturer) was sold to GENUI Partners in October 2016.  In October 2020, Cherry was acquired by the private equity firm Argand Partners and as of June 2021 is now listed on the Frankfurt Stock Exchange as C3RY.

History

Cherry was founded by Walter Cherry in 1953 in the basement of a restaurant in Highland Park, Illinois, USA. With the passing of its founder, his son Peter took over the ownership of the organization. The company's headquarters were moved to Auerbach in der Oberpfalz, Germany in 1979. Cherry has manufactured keyboards since 1973, and claims to be the oldest keyboard manufacturer still in business.

In 2008, Cherry was bought by ZF Friedrichshafen AG and incorporated as the ZF Electronics GmbH Corporate Division. The Cherry brand continues to be used.

In 2019, the company attracted controversy when it offered a giveaway that excluded female gamers, resulting in a boycott by some users in China. The company argued that it would still give prizes to women, amending the giveaway.

Cherry maintains production facilities in Europe (most notably in Bayreuth, Germany), Asia, and the Americas. All of its products are designed and developed at the company's headquarters in Auerbach in der Oberpfalz. It also has offices in the UK, Italy, France, Hong Kong, India, Mexico, Australia and other locations, with distributors in most major countries.

Products
Among Cherry's widely known products are its line of MX and ML key switches, including red, blue, and brown switches, that have been used in industrial electronics and point of sale environments since their inception in the 1980s, and more recently (~2008) by numerous manufacturers of consumer PC keyboards.

At CES 2017, the company announced an update of its "classic" G80-3000 keyboard, with a noise reduction. The Verge said that the new version "fixed a fatal flaw" with the company's mechanical keyboards – their clicking keyboard noises. According to TechCrunch, Cherry "has long been the de facto standard for mechanical keyboard switches." Three years later, the company launches it first "fully mechanical switch" intended for the "value market," or lower cost keyboards.

Currently, Cherry makes the following products:
 Keyboards
 Mice
 Card reader
 Peripheral
 MIX Technology

Cherry MX 

Cherry “Mechanical X-Point” technology, Shortened to MX, switches were developed and patented in the early 1980s and first marketed around 1985. In the consumer keyboard market, Cherry MX switches are often referenced by the color of the key stem—the part of the switch below the keycap which moves downwards when pressed.

Keyboard makers such as Cooler Master, Corsair, and G.Skill use Cherry's Cherry MX switches in their designs or "imitate them," such as Razer's Kailh Green switches in the first Generation Razer Black widow Chroma. Cherry sells its own keyboards in "modest volumes." Its MX 10.0 TKL keyboard lacks the tenkey section of the keyboard. In 2018, the company introduced mechanical keyboard switches for thinner keyboards. It makes its Cherry MX Silent switches, or Pink switches, as a range on keyboards like the Corsair K70.

Most common Cherry MX switches are:
 Linear
 Red
 Silent Red
 Speed Silver
 Nature White
 Black
 Silent Black
 Linear Grey
Tactile, non-clicky
 Brown
 Clear
 Tactile Grey
 Tactile and clicky
 Blue
 White
 Green

Cherry MX Grey switches can be found in linear (which provides a smooth, consistent feel sans feedback), tactile, and clicky variants. They are distinguished by stem color, with linear being darker than tactile. The clicky version is no longer made. It is debated as to whether it even clicks, since it is not listed as a "click" switch by Cherry in their 1994 "Keymodule MX brochure", along with MX Whites, which are greased to reduce the click. Given their use primarily in large keys like , the feel is selected to match that of the other keys on the board.

Other types of Cherry MX switches, such as Green and Grey, are used for larger keys (etc.). The feel of Cherry MX Green switches are often compared to that of the "buckling spring" switches on original IBM Model M keyboards. Cherry switches have an advertised lifespan of up to 100 million actuations, depending on switch type.

The auditory and tactile nature of each switch, and the amount of force needed to actuate it, vary depending on the switch type:

Cherry ML 

Cherry Mechanical Low-profile (ML) switches are available in a tactile variant, with force and operating characteristics similar to that of Cherry MX Brown switches, but with shortened travel. The rated service life of ML switches is 20 million keystrokes, approximately  that of the rated MX life.

In 2018, Cherry introduced the MX Low Profile switch to supplement the ML switch.

Awards
In 2008, Cherry's production facility in Bayreuth received the Bayerischer Qualitätspreis 2008 award. At the end of 2006, Cherry received the Automotive Lean Production Award of the German economy magazine Automobil-Produktion. In 2005, Cherry GmbH in Auerbach received the Industrial Excellence Award as best European industrial facility.

See also
 List of mechanical keyboards
 Alps Electric

References

External links
 Cherry MX switches website
 ZF Switches & Sensors website (previously Cherry Switches)
 Overview of Cherry mechanical switches
 Cherry MX mechanical switches guide (with sounds of each switch)

Technology companies of Germany
Technology companies of the United States
Electronics companies of Germany
Electronics companies of the United States
Point of sale companies
Computer peripheral companies
German brands
Computer keyboard companies